NGC 7051 is a barred spiral galaxy located about 100 million light-years away in the constellation of Aquarius. It was discovered by astronomer John Herschel on July 30, 1827.

On June 18, 2002 a type II supernova designated as SN 2002dq was discovered in NGC 7051.

See also 
 NGC 7042

References

External links 

Barred spiral galaxies
Aquarius (constellation)
7051
66566
Astronomical objects discovered in 1827